TEDxLagos is an independent TEDx event held annually in Lagos, Nigeria. Like other TEDx events, the event obtained a free license from TED to hold the conference, with organizers agreeing to follow certain principles. In 2018, the refreshed TEDxLagos hosted 12 speakers at the Muson Centre.

History
TEDxLagos was founded as an independent TEDx event by the original organizers of TEDxGbagada. In 2018, TEDxLagos reviewed numerous candidates and hosted 12 speakers on August 18, 2018 at the Muson Centre, Lagos Island. The hosts for the pre-recorded event were Nigerian comedian Bovi and Award-winning media entrepreneur Uche Eze founder of BellaNaija, who is also a TEDGlobal Fellow. TEDxLagos partnered with the Skoll Foundation and Union Bank of Nigeria for the 2018 event.

2019

 Vivian Oputa 
 Nireti adebayo
 Nse Ikpe-Etim
 Clare Omatseye
 Olumide Soyombo
 Alade Maryam and Okechukwu Emmanuel
 Victor Sanchez Aghahowa
 Ayorinde B James
 Otto Orondaam
 Isioma Williams
 The Cavemen

2018 (Relaunch)

 Simidele Adeagbo
 Ade Olufeko
 Clare Omatseye
 Tokini Peterside
 Janah Ncube
 Femi Leye (Performer)
 Damilola Onafuwa
 Boye Olusanya
 Supo Shasore
 Banky W
 Anthonia Ojenagbon
 James George
 Tope Okupe
 Dreamcatchers (Performer)

2013
Rebranded from TEDxVictoriaIsland, the first version of TEDxLagos themed Inclusion, took place in 2013 under a different organizing committee.

 Kunlé Adeyemi
 Tayo Oviosu
 Kola Karim
 Deepankar Rustagi
 Bobo Omotayo
 Tannaz Bahnam
 Somi
 Kelechi Amadi-Obi
 Tunde Kelani
 Nkemdilim Begho
 Dr. Innocent Okuku
 Yewande Sadiku
 Tonye Cole
 Tope Sadiq
 Bilikiss Adebiyi Abiola
 Nnenna Onyewuchi
 Papa Njie
 Uwa Agbonile
 Bunmi Otegbade
 Chef Fregz
 eLDee
 Wumi Oghoetuoma
 Azu Nwagbogu

See also
Lagos Island

References

External links
 TEDxLagos official site
 TED overview of the TEDx program

Events in Lagos
Lagos